Heckmondwike is a town in the metropolitan borough of Kirklees, West Yorkshire, England,  south west of Leeds. Historically part of the West Riding of Yorkshire, it is close to Cleckheaton and Liversedge. It is mostly in the Batley and Spen parliamentary constituency, and had an estimated population of 17,066 in March 2001, reducing to 16,986 at the 2011 Census. Heckmondwike forms part of the Heavy Woollen District.

Toponymy
The origins of Heckmondwike are in Old English. First recorded as Hedmundewic  in the Domesday Book of 1086, Hedmundewic in 1166, and as Hecmundewik sometime in the 13th century, the name seems to be from *Hēahmundes wīc, or 'Heahmund's dairy-farm'.

History
During Saxon times, Heckmondwike was a "berewick" or independent village in the manor of Gomersal, which, before 1066, was held by Dunstan and Gamel.

The Poll Tax of 1379 records seven families in Heckmondwike, about 35 people:  including one named Thomas of Stubly. Most lived in isolated farmsteads such as Stubley Farm, on high ground overlooking the marshy Spen Valley floor.

In 1684, there were around 250 people, occupying 50 houses, in the town. The town became famous for manufacturing blankets, and by 1811 the Blanket Hall was built for trade in the town's primary manufacture. It was replaced by a second hall erected in 1839, on Blanket Hall Street in the town centre. Elizabeth Gaskell's biography of Charlotte Brontë in 1857 described the inhabitants of Heckmondwike as "a chapel-going people, very critical of their sermons, tyrannical to their ministers and violent radicals".

The town ceased generating electricity in 1924. The Power Company buildings survive in part on Bath Road.
The remains of the first Blanket Hall were demolished in spring 2008, along with a number of other old buildings including some former Co-op buildings that had been used as the post office and former "George" public house.

A health centre was opened in July 2010 to house two former doctors' practices.

Geography

Located at the edge of the Pennine hills, the land rises to the north, east and south of the town centre. The town covers an area of one square mile (640 acres), the town boundary is not the same as the ward boundary.

Heckmondwike has a telephone exchange, north of High Street in the Wakefield 01924 dialling area. The exchange covers Liversedge, and parts of Dewsbury Moor and Staincliffe.

Politics
In 1894 Heckmondwike Urban District Council was established and was incorporated into Kirklees in the local government reorganisation of 1974. The Heckmondwike electoral ward includes Millbridge, Flush, and Norristhorpe in Liversedge south of the A62 road. Heckmondwike ward is represented on Kirklees Council by three Labour councillors.

In 2003 the ward elected David Exley of the British National Party, after the serving councillor left the Labour Party to run as an independent. Exley was re-elected in 2004, and in 2006 a second BNP member, Roger Roberts, was elected. Roberts had previously served as councillor for the Conservative Party. In May 2007 David Sheard (Labour), was returned. In May 2008 Exley lost his seat to Labour candidate Steve Hall. In May 2010 Roberts lost his seat to Labour candidate Viv Kendrick. Sheard was re-elected in 2011, and Hall was re-elected in 2012.

Newspapers
The weekly newspaper was the Heckmondwike Herald until Friday 15 August 2008 after which the title was merged into the Spenborough Guardian incorporating the Heckmondwike Herald. It covers the former Spenborough Urban District and Heckmondwike.

Transportation 
The town has its own bus station.

Pop Culture
In season 3 episode 26 of the Andy Griffith show a gentleman's gentleman passes through Mayberry on his American tour. He is from Heckmondwike, England. After causing a traffic accident he is forced to work off the damages as Andy's personal valet.

Notable people

James Berry (1852–1913), executioner
Horace Brearley (1913–2007), cricketer and schoolmaster 
Jeff Butterfield (1929–2004), international rugby union footballer.
Jo Cox (1974–2016), Labour MP
John Curwen (1816–1880), Congregationalist minister who founded the Tonic Sol-fa system of music education; Curwen Crescent and Curwen Park in the town are named for him.
Mabel Ferrett (1917-2011), poet, publisher, literary editor and local historian
Mike Heaton (b. 1967), drummer for post-Britpop band Embrace.
Kim Leadbeater (b. 1976), Labour MP
The Rt Rev. John Monsignor O'Connor (1870–1952), an Irish Catholic priest who served as Parish Priest of Heckmondwike from 1909 to 1919. He was the inspiration for Father Brown, the fictional character created by G.K. Chesterton (1874–1936). While serving in Heckmondwike, the then Father O'Connor had the Church of the Holy Spirit constructed. The church was completed in 1915.
George Arthur Pollard (1863–1939), New Zealand salvation army officer and administrator
Dave Pybus (b. 1970), bassist member of extreme metal band, Cradle of Filth.
Frederick Wilson Whitehead (1863–1926), composer and organist.
Arthur Wood (1875–1953), composer famous for the 1924 piece, Barwick Green, which is used as the theme song for the BBC Radio 4 series, The Archers.

Location grid

See also
Listed buildings in Heckmondwike
Sugden Audio

References

External links

   Heckmondwike Central railway station
  Heckmondwike Spen railway station

 
Towns in West Yorkshire
Unparished areas in West Yorkshire
Heavy Woollen District
Geography of Kirklees